In probability and statistics, a circular distribution or polar distribution is a probability distribution of a random variable whose values are angles, usually taken to be in the range  A circular distribution is often a continuous probability distribution, and hence has a probability density, but such distributions can also be discrete, in which case they are called circular lattice distributions. Circular distributions can be used even when the variables concerned are not explicitly angles: the main consideration is that there is not usually any real distinction between events occurring at the lower or upper end of the range, and the division of the range could notionally be made at any point.

Graphical representation

If a circular distribution has a density

it can be graphically represented as a closed curve

where the radius  is set equal to

and where a and b are chosen on the basis of appearance.

Examples

By computing the probability distribution of angles along a handwritten ink trace,
a lobe-shaped polar distribution emerges. The main direction of the lobe in the
first quadrant corresponds to the slant of handwriting (see: graphonomics).

An example of a circular lattice distribution would be the probability of being born in a given month of the year, with each calendar month being thought of as arranged round a circle, so that "January" is next to "December".

See also
Circular mean
Circular uniform distribution
von Mises distribution

References

External links
 Circular Values Math and Statistics with C++11, A C++11 infrastructure for circular values (angles, time-of-day, etc.) mathematics and statistics

Types of probability distributions
Directional statistics
Statistical charts and diagrams